Ali Etesamifar (born in 1990 Qazvin, Iran) is an Iranian Puppeteer, Puppet Maker and Puppet Designer. He has appeared in many Iranian TV series and features including kolah ghermezi TV series (The one with The red hat) directed by Iraj Tahmasb and City of Mice 2 feature film directed by legendary Iranian director, Marzieh Boroumand. He also directed an experimental puppet theatre called "The Garden Solo" (Painful Story of The Old  Man) nominated by the 16th Mobarak International puppet theatre festival.

Work

Awards 
1.Winner of 1st and 2nd places in Puppet designing and making at the 11th International Student Puppetry Festival.

2.Winner of 1st place in Puppet performing at the 14th International Student Puppetry Festival/ Blond redhead theater

References

1990 births
Living people
Puppeteers
Iranian designers
People from Qazvin